Neil Robinson may refer to:

Sports
 Neil Robinson (baseball) (1908–1983), American baseball player
 Neil Robinson (footballer, born 1979), English football player for Macclesfield
 Neil Robinson (footballer, born 1957) (1957–2002), English football player for Everton and Grimsby Town
 Neil Robinson (table tennis), Great Britain table tennis player

Others
 Neil Robinson (priest) (1929–2009), Archdeacon of Suffolk
 Neil Robinson (motorcyclist) (1962–1986), motorcycle racer from Northern Ireland
 Neil Robinson (actor) (1935–1997), English actor in The Wringer